Vera Neferović (12 January 1907 – 13 May 1989) was a Croatian athlete. She competed in the women's discus throw at the 1936 Summer Olympics, representing Yugoslavia.

References

1907 births
1989 deaths
Athletes (track and field) at the 1936 Summer Olympics
Croatian female discus throwers
Olympic athletes of Yugoslavia
Place of birth missing